Good Fellow Club Youth Camp is a historic summer camp and a national historic district located at Porter, Porter County, Indiana.  The district encompasses nine contributing buildings, seven contributing structures, and one contributing site built by U.S. Steel for its employees' children.  The contributing resources include the camp site with roadways and foundations of removed buildings, administration building (lodge, 1941), gate house and flagstone wall (1946), caretaker's house and garage (1941), pool house (1946), steel footbridge, steel swimming pool (1946), riflery (c. 1951), and tennis courts (1946). The buildings reflect the Adirondack rustic and American Craftsman architectural styles.  The camp remained in operation until 1976, and is now part of the Indiana Dunes National Lakeshore.

It was listed on the National Register of Historic Places in 2013.

References

Historic districts on the National Register of Historic Places in Indiana
Bungalow architecture in Indiana
Buildings and structures completed in 1941
Historic districts in Porter County, Indiana
National Register of Historic Places in Porter County, Indiana
National Register of Historic Places in Indiana Dunes National Park